CDP-diacylglycerol—inositol 3-phosphatidyltransferase is an enzyme that in humans is encoded by the CDIPT gene.

Phosphatidylinositol breakdown products are ubiquitous second messengers that function downstream of multiple G protein-coupled receptors and tyrosine kinases regulating cell growth, calcium metabolism, and protein kinase C activity. Two enzymes, CDP-diacylglycerol synthase and phosphatidylinositol synthase, are involved in the biosynthesis of phosphatidylinositol. Phosphatidylinositol synthase, a member of the CDP-alcohol phosphatidyl transferase class-I family, is an integral membrane protein found on the cytoplasmic side of the endoplasmic reticulum and the Golgi apparatus.

References

External links

Further reading